The China Railways JF15 (解放15, Jiěfàng, "liberation") class steam locomotive was a class of 2-8-2 steam locomotives operated by the China Railway, built by the American Locomotive Company in the United States in 1928−1929.

These locomotives were originally built for the Jihai Railway. After the Japanese established the puppet state of Manchukuo, these and other privately owned railways in the territory of Manchukuo were nationalised to create the Manchukuo National Railway, which designated these the Mikasa (ミカサ) class, becoming Mikana (ミカナ) class after the classification reform of 1938.

After the end of the Pacific War, these locomotives were passed on to the Republic of China Railway. After the establishment of the People's Republic of China, China Railways designated them ㄇㄎ15 (MK15) class in 1951, and subsequently 解放15 (JF15) class in 1959.

References

2-8-2 locomotives
ALCO locomotives
Railway locomotives introduced in 1928
 Scrapped locomotives
Steam locomotives of China
Standard gauge locomotives of China
Rolling stock of Manchukuo
Freight locomotives